Charaxes ocellatus is a butterfly from the family Nymphalidae. Hans Fruhstorfer described it in 1896. It is endemic to the Lesser Sunda Islands in the Australasian realm (close to the Wallace line).

Charaxes ocellatus is a large butterfly. The forewings have a concave outer edge and the hindwings bear two tails. The upper side is light brown in the basal part and dark in the distal part, separated by a white bar on the forewings from the middle of the costal margin to the inner edge near the anal angle. The hindwings are light brown and decorated with a submarginal line of dark brown ocelli.

Technical description

Male and female: The underside is creamy white, the body above tawny, thorax somewhat olivaceous.

Male wings: Above chestnut-tawny, forewing darker than hindwing, outer region of the forewing and postdisco-submarginal patches of hindwing black. Forewing falcate, crossed by an oblique discal band of pure white patches, the band not reaching SM2, widest in front, bordered proximally by tie median bars R2-SM2 and bar D, median bars SC2-R2 within the band, bars R1-M2 arched, patch M2-SM2 very much smaller than the one before it; one or two whitish or pinkish buff postdiscal spots between SC4 and R1 about halfway between band and apex, the second spot mostly absent, sometimes both scarcely traceable; internervular folds with buffish longitudinal lines at the margin; fringe white except at veins.

Hindwing: Median bars C-R3 present, standing in an obliquely curved row, bars R3-M2 also often indicated, more proximal than bar R2-R3, a series of patches at the outer side of these bars, the upper one white and largest, the other gradually becoming smaller and more and more tawny; discal bars luniform, dark tawny, or blackish, the upper ones forming the border of the pale discal patches often obsolete, tlie series strongly and obliquely curved; postdisco-submarginal black patches very large, the upper two permanently fused together, mainly the upper four not separated, patch SC2-R1 10 mm long, the patches becoming gradually smaller, they are separated from the discal bars by ochraceous halfmoons; white submarginal dots all present, the upper two the largest, the last three sometimes vestigial; admarginal interspaces ochraceous, the previous three joined along veins to postdiscal lunules of the same colour, the upper four more restricted, separated between veins into dots, in which case cellule S-SC2 has no such admarginal spots, the black postdisco-submarginal patches being wholly fused to the margini-admarginal line, or the spots are not divided at internervnlar fold; admarginal line touching postdisco-submarginal patches at veins C-R3, extended to edge of wing, black in front, more tawny behind, tails dark tawny or blackish, tips edged with buff or white, fringe white between veins.

Underside: Fawn-colour, basal to median bars pale chestnut, heavy, basal cell spot present on both wings. 

Forewing: Cell-bar 4 touching M closer to M2 than M1, its shorter costal portion curved, about at right angles to the longer and obliquely placed hinder portion; median bars M2-SM2 very oblique, reaching SM2 8 mm from end, hence median interspace considerably widening behind white band as above, posteriorly bordered by the discal bars, but as the series of bars is almost parallel to margin it recedes costad more and more from band, the interspace is pale drab; discal bars outwardly bordered with creamy scaling which forms generally halfmoons; postdiscal bars represented by patches of variable and different size, patches M1-SM2 black, triangular, the others somewhat chocolate, the submedian ones fused together, but generally incised externally upon (SM1), patches R2-M1 and SC5-R1 much smaller, often also patch R1-R2, outwardly the postdiscal spots bear whitish, triangular dots, or greyish lunules, except the last patch, which is bordered externally with a bluish grey, sometimes M-shaped, patch; admarginal interspaces more or less grey.

Hindwing: Median series of bars obliquely curved from C to R3 then again from R3 to (SM1), forming an angle upon R2, bars M2-SM2 forming an acute angle upon (SM1) pointing basad, often reaching the angle which is formed by the respective submedian bars and which means distad; basal and subbasal costal bars present; a longitudinal line upon fold SM2-SM3 as in orilus; SM2 mostly chocolate in middle; discal interspaces filled up by a white band which is more or less widely separated from the discal lunules by rather welldefined continuous patches of isabella colour; discal and postdiscal bars luniform, the former not prominent, partly obsolete, separated from the postdiscal ones creamy lunules which are somewhat thicker than the discal bars; postdiscal bars chestnut, bars C-SC2 and R1-R2 are always patch-like, while bar R3-M1 and mostly also bar SC2-R1 are thin; submarginal white dots present, but spot R3-M1 sometimes inconspicuous owing to the respective interspace between the black and blue submargiual dot and postdiscal bar being much shaded with cream colour; admarginal interspaces cream-buff, small; admarginal line pale drab: edge of wing greyish between veins; tails pale drab, creamy at tips, both somewhat spaulate upper 9 to 9 1/2 mm long, second slightly curved costad, 7 mm long. 

Female: Like male, but somewhat larger, forewing above slightly darker in basal half, tails somewhat longer. Length of forewing: male 38–40 mm. female 44–50 mm.

Subspecies
C. o. ocellatus (Lombok)
C. o. sumbanus Rothschild, 1896 (Sumba)
C. o. sambavanus Rothschild, 1896 (Sumbawa)
C. o. florensis Rothschild, 1900 (Flores)
C. o. straatmani Nishiyama & Ohtani, 1981 (Alor)

Discovery and naming
This very remarkable insect, discovered by W. Doherty in February 1896 at Sambawa and Sumba, was shortly afterwards also found at Lombak by H. Fruhstorfer. The name of ocellatus has two or three days' priority over that of sumbanus and hence must be employed to designate the species.

References

External links
Charaxes Ochsenheimer, 1816 at Markku Savela's Lepidoptera and Some Other Life Forms

ocellatus
Butterflies described in 1896